is a Japanese diver. She competed in the women's 3 metre springboard event at the 2019 World Aquatics Championships. She qualified to represent Japan at the 2020 Summer Olympics.

References

External links
 

2000 births
Living people
Japanese female divers
Place of birth missing (living people)
Divers at the 2020 Summer Olympics
Olympic divers of Japan
Divers at the 2018 Asian Games
World Aquatics Championships medalists in diving
21st-century Japanese women